Machi is a 2004 Indian Tamil-language action film directed by K. S. Vasantha Kumar. The film stars Dushyanth and Shubha Poonja, with Pasupathy, Bhanu Chander, Sulakshana, S. R. Prakash, Sathish, Ranjan and V. Sankar playing supporting roles. The film, produced by S. K. Krishnakanth, was released on 25 June 2004.

Plot

Karthik (Dushyanth) is a rich spoiled brat from Mumbai who likes to spend time drinking alcohol in pubs and going night-clubbing. His father Mohanram (Bhanu Chander), tired of seeing his son drunk every night, forces him to enroll in a medical college in Coimbatore. In Coimbatore, far from changing his behavior, Karthik rags the college students. Then, he meets four of his classmates: Pandi (S. R. Prakash), Babu (Sathish), Vasu (Ranjan) and Moses (V. Sankar) who come from middle-class families. The four think that they are now friends with Karthik, but he makes sure that they are not friends. The haughty Karthik even makes fun of their looks and social status.

One night, the carefree Karthik, who was really drunk, is struck by a lorry. Covered with blood and lying on the road, Karthik asks for help, but no one would help him. One person even stole his gold chain and purse. Then, the four friends take him to the nearby hospital, pay the hospital fees for him, and take care of him until he recovers. Karthik then realizes his mistakes. He changes his attitude, and the friends become close. In the meantime, Karthik falls in love with the bubbly Rakshita (Shubha Poonja). Thereafter, Rakshita invites him and his friend to the restaurant. At the restaurant, the four friends get into a fight with Govind (Cool Suresh), who teased Karthik. The same night, Kathik's friends are kidnapped by Govind and beaten up, then Karthik comes to their rescue and saves them. During the fight, Govind's face is disfigured by acid.

Govind is none other than the only son of politician Narayanan (Pasupathy). Narayanan, who was a beggar 25 years back, is now the most powerful politician of Coimbatore. He wants to become the Chief Minister of Tamil Nadu at any cost, and also wants people to respect him, praise him, or at least fear him. Mad with rage to see his son in this condition, Narayanan sends his henchmen to kill the five friends, but Karthik beats them up with ease. What transpires next forms the rest of the story.

Cast

Production
Following the release of the film Success (2003), Dushyanth announced that his second film would be an action film and produced by S. K. Krishnakanth, who earlier produced films like King (2002), Thiruda Thirudi  (2003) and Pudhukottaiyilirundhu Saravanan (2004). The film would directed by the debutant K. S. Vasantha Kumar who had worked under Ramana Madhesh, an associate of S. Shankar. R. Madhi was hired as cinematographer and A. R. Rahman's sister A. R. Reihana was introduced a music director.

Newcomer Shubha Poonja was signed to play the female lead, making her acting debut in Tamil cinema. Pasupathy, who came to limelight playing a negative character in Kamal Haasan's Virumaandi, signed to play the antagonist role. The rest of the cast includes Sulakshana, Anjali Devi and Bhanu Chander. The entire cast was provided formal training for 45 days rehearsing nearly all the scenes with full dialogue and costumes. For the first time, this method is being tried in Tamil cinema. The film was entirely shot in Coimbatore.

Soundtrack

The film score and the soundtrack were composed by A. R. Reihana. The soundtrack, released in 2004, features 7 tracks with lyrics written by Kalaikumar, Kabilan and Annamalai. The soundtrack received below average reviews upon release. Malathi Rangarajan of The Hindu stated, "A. R. Rehana's music in Machi is only an aural intrusion". Another critic said, "None of the songs make a mark". Indiaglitz wrote, "if she prefers to have a style of her own in composing music rather than reflecting Rahman's, her success is assured".

Release
The film received mixed reviews from critics with a critic noting : "Dushyanth as the ‘hero' has improved leaps and bounds from Success, in dialogue delivery and expressions. Newcomer Subha Punja is there for songs and dances and is too skinny to be a Tamil heroine. Pasupathy as the villain hams outrageously, very similar to his character in the recent Arul. On the whole Machi is entertaining and has a message on friendship". Malathi Rangarajan of The Hindu wrote, "Racy, thrilling and suspenseful for the most part, Machi, despite certain snags, comes as a surprise". Indiaglitz labelled the film as "fast paced action entertainer" and praised the cinematographer R. Madhi's camera work. Another reviewer 
stated "This is a movie that is in dire need of some editing. Many of the scenes are long drawn-out and test our patience" and added "Dushyanth shows some improvement from his debut Success but not enough to mark him as a hero of promise".

References

2004 films
2000s Tamil-language films
Indian action films
Films shot in Coimbatore
2004 directorial debut films
Films scored by A. R. Reihana
2004 action films